The Dulwich Old College War Memorial is located in the forecourt of Dulwich Old College on College Road in Dulwich in the London Borough of Southwark. It marks the deaths of the former pupils of the college who died in the First World War between 1914 and 1919. The memorial is made from Hopton Wood stone and was designed by William Douglas Caröe. It was unveiled in 1921. It has been grade II listed on the National Heritage List for England since May 2010. The heritage listing places the memorial within a "visual and contextual relationship" with the Grade II listed Old College building and the entrance gates and piers of the Old College, also Grade II listed.

Description
The memorial is in the form of a tall tapering shaft of Hopton Wood stone, topped by a diamond entablature which bears carved images of Christ the King to the north and south sides.
 
The shaft stands on a square pedestal, with its north face decorated with the shield of Dulwich College with the college motto DETUR GLORIA/ SOLI DEO ("Let glory be given to God alone") inscribed above, and the south face has a panel with a design of a double trefoil-headed window. 
 
The pedestal stands on a four tiered octagonal plinth.  The top tier is decorated with floral motifs and encircled by an inscription in raised letters:

Oak panels on the south wall of Christ's Chapel in the Old College building record the names of the dead.

See also
Dulwich College War Memorial

References

External links
 War Memorials Online
 Badsey Society
 

1921 establishments in England
1921 in London
1921 sculptures
Buildings and structures completed in 1921
Dulwich
Grade II listed buildings in the London Borough of Southwark
Grade II listed monuments and memorials
Military memorials in London
Stone monuments and memorials
Buildings by W. D. Caröe
World War I memorials in England